Khalil Kain is an American actor, film producer and best known for his role as Raheem Porter in the 1992 crime thriller film Juice and as the second Darnell Wilkes on the UPN/CW sitcom Girlfriends (2001–2008). He is also known for his role as Patrick Peet in the 2001 horror film Bones.

Biography
Kain was born in Manhattan, New York City, New York. His mother, June, is of African American and Chinese descent. Kain attended Hunter College High School in New York and later relocated to California, attending Foothill High School; graduating in 1983.

Career
Kain first appeared in the 1992 film Juice as Raheem. Following roles included Roosevelt Nathaniel Hobbs in the 1994 comedy drama Renaissance Man and Marvin Cox in the 1997 romantic comedy, Love Jones. Kain portrayed golfer Tiger Woods in Showtime's The Tiger Woods Story. In 2001, he teamed again with Juice director Ernest Dickerson in Bones (starring Snoop Dogg).  Kain had a role in the 2003 blaxploitation biopic Baadasssss!.

Kain appeared as Darnell Wilkes, Maya's (portrayed by Golden Brooks) husband on the UPN/CW TV series Girlfriends from the season 2 through the conclusion of the series. Kain replaced his Juice co-star Flex Alexander, who left to star in the sitcom One on One. Other television credits include Suddenly Susan, Friends, Blue Bloods, Living Single, Moesha, Angel, and Sister, Sister.  He also played the role of Bill in the 2010 movie For Colored Girls.

Khalil Kain directed The Millennial, which he also stars in along with Erica Mena, Terayle Hill and Terri Vaughn. The world premiere for The Millennial was in August 2021 at the Hip Hop Film Festival.

Personal
Since 1996, Kain has been an avid student of martial arts and holds a black belt in Hapkido.

Filmography

Film

Television

References

External links

Living people
African-American male actors
American hapkido practitioners
American male film actors
American people of Chinese descent
American male television actors
People from Manhattan
20th-century American male actors
21st-century American male actors
20th-century African-American people
21st-century African-American people
Year of birth missing (living people)